HCN-0.009-0.044 is an interstellar gas cloud near the centre of the Milky Way. The cloud is only 25 light-years from Sagittarius A*. It likely hosts an intermediate-mass black hole with a mass of 32,000 times that of the Sun. HCN-0.009-0.044 has a diameter of about 3 light years, and has relative gas movements of 40 km/s, with a kinematic energy of over 1047 ergs. The HCN in the name indicates the presence of hydrogen cyanide (HCN). HCN radiation at 354.6 GHz in the submillimeter was detected from the cloud.

References

Further reading
 

Intermediate-mass black holes
Sagittarius (constellation)